Slavutych Smolensk is an ice hockey team in Smolensk, Russia. The club was founded in 2010, and plays in the Pervaya Liga.

External links
Official site

Ice hockey teams in Russia
Sport in Smolensk
2010 establishments in Russia
Ice hockey clubs established in 2010